Cynthia Enid Olavarría Rivera (born January 28, 1982 in Santurce) is a Puerto Rican actress, fashion model, TV host and beauty pageant titleholder who won  Miss Puerto Rico Universe 2005 and placed 1st Runner-Up at Miss Universe 2005.

Biography

Early years
Born in the Santurce district of San Juan, Puerto Rico, Olavarría was an expressive and eloquent child. Those qualities made her embark in the world of beauty pageants, TV hosting and modeling since she was a teenager. At age 11, she won her first beauty pageant, "Miss Reina Infantil" and became the host of the famous Puerto Rican child game show Contra el Reloj con Pacheco.

Studies
Cynthia Olavarria attended Colegio La Piedad, a private school in Isla Verde, Puerto Rico, where she was an honor student and member of many school organizations, including the National Honor Society and the Student Council. After graduating high school, she enrolled in the University of Puerto Rico, Río Piedras Campus, where she managed to combine her studies with her modeling career. She graduated magna cum laude in 2004 with a bachelor's degree in Mass Communications, with a concentration in Journalism and Public Relations.

Modeling career
At age 16, she started out as a model by competing in Elite Model Look Competition Puerto Rico, where she placed third. This served as springboard to develop a long modeling career where she has enjoyed  success, achieving over 20 magazine covers and publications in Indonesia, Dominican Republic, Miami, New York, and Puerto Rico.

Many awards have been given to her for her trajectory, including two awards for “Best Female Model” and a recognition as a Puerto Rican “Top Model”. She also received the “International Model Ambassador Award” at the Chicago Latino Fashion Week in 2007, and another recognition as “Outstanding Model of the Year” in the Latin Pride National Awards.

Beauty pageants
Olavarria's history with pageants started at age 11 when she won her first beauty pageant, "Miss Reina Infantil". When she became 16, she competed in Elite Model Look Puerto Rico.

After graduating from college, Olavarría was headed towards a master's degree in International Relations as well as a career with Elite Model Management when she decided to temporarily change her path in order to participate in the Miss Puerto Rico Universe 2005 pageant, where she won the crown representing the municipality of Salinas in October 2004.

She represented Puerto Rico in the Miss Universe 2005 pageant held in Bangkok, Thailand in May 2005, and became the first and only Puerto Rican in Miss Universe history to place 1st Runner-Up until 2019 when Madison Anderson achieved this feat. The winner was Natalie Glebova of Canada. When Glebova was unable to attend the Miss Indonesia 2007 pageant on behalf of the Miss Universe Organization because of Canada's travel ban on Indonesia, Olavarría officially attended in her place.

During the course of her reign, she made many appearances on such television programs such as Don Francisco Presenta, El Gordo y La Flaca, Despierta America, Cotorreando, Primer Impacto, Objetivo Fama, Premios Juventud, and Premios Lo Nuestro.

Given her success in beauty pageants she has been invited to be a judge in several international beauty pageants, along with hosting some of them. Most recently she was a judge for the "Miss Universe Puerto Rico 2014" pageant.

Acting career
After finishing her undergraduate studies and returning from Miss Universe, Olavarria began taking acting lessons with actresses Elia Enid Cadilla, Flor Nunez and Sebastian Ligarde and completed the acting program of Hector Zavaleta in hopes of also  becoming an actress.  Her television debut was as the protagonist of a mini-series called “Cuando el Universo Conspira” in 2005. Later she made her theater debut by playing a major role as a princess in the child-oriented play “La Princesa de los Ojos Tristes”. In 2006, she appeared in Victor Manuelle and Sin Bandera’s musical video entitled “Maldita Suerte”. In 2007, she landed the protagonist role in the first-ever online telenovela for the Hispanic market, "Mi Adorada Malena", which was produced by Univision and broadcast on its website. Due to its success, it was later broadcast nationally on the network.

In July 2010 she landed the role of Lucy Saldana in Telemundo's telenovela-thriller Alguien Te Mira. She plays a crazy massage therapist that is obsessed with one of her coworkers and will stop at nothing to destroy his marriage so she can have him. In December 2010 she also played the main role in the music video of Jencarlos Canela's new single, titled "Mi Corazon Insiste".

In August 2013 Cynthia won a supporting actress award "Premios Tu Mundo" for her role as the good natured Diana Mercader in the  telenovela-thriller  "El Rostro De La Venganza".

As much as Cynthia enjoyed winning a "Tu Mundo" for interpreting angelic/good natured roles she also feared the award might typecast her indefinitely in such characters.  However, early in November 2014 People en Español magazine announced that Telemundo Studios had cast Cynthia in a stellar villainess role in "Tierra De Reyes" a remake of the highly popular Colombian telenovela "Pasion De Gavilanes".  This time she would be interpreting the diabolical, Isadora Valverde, a dangerous and obsessive woman who runs a drug cartel and who obsesses in a love triangle between actors Fabian Rios and Aaron Diaz.

Television
Her hosting career started at an early age when she became the host of Contra el Reloj con Pacheco. After this, she made multiple appearances as a guest host for various television networks in Puerto Rico and many international events, mainly beauty pageants.

In the United States, she has been a presenter at Premios Juventud, Premios Lo Nuestro, Billboard Latin Music Awards, and the Mexican Billboard Awards. She has also served as guest host in Despierta América,  Escandalo TV, and Al Rojo Vivo.

In 2007, Univision recruited her to become the official Runway Coach of the hit reality show Nuestra Belleza Latina which airs on the Univision network. There she held an active role in this position for three years total (2007–2010) while also doing work for other Univision sister networks. In February 2010 she moved on to work for Galavision as a news correspondent and co-host of Acceso Maximo.

Cynthia also worked for Univision's rival network Telemundo as the host of Decisiones Puerto Rico, the Puerto Rican adaptation of the Telemundo's series Decisiones. In 2008, she also hosted a Miss Universe special titled “Intimamente con Miss Universo” for Telemundo. The one-hour show follows the steps of Miss Universe 2008, Dayana Mendoza, after winning the title.

In 2007 and 2008, she joined Mexican singer and actor Fernando Allende to host the Miss World Puerto Rico pageant.

Recently she was also the temporary host of Telemundo's Al Rojo Vivo in November 2010 while she filmed the telenovela Alguien Te Mira. She also starred Mi Corazón Insiste… en Lola Volcán with Carmen Villalobos, Jencarlos Canela, Carlos Ferro, and Ana Layesksa where she plays Sofia Palacio. In 2012 she participated in Telemundo's El Rostro de la Venganza, with Elizabeth Gutiérrez, David Chocarro, Maritza Rodríguez and Saúl Lisazo; for which she won "Mejor Actriz de Reparto" (Best Supporting Actress) at Premios Tu Mundo.

Early in 2014 it was announced that Cynthia will be starring in Top Chef Estrallas, a Latin American version of the reality cooking television show Top Chef that will air on Telemundo with stars competing for their choice of charity.

Present 
Her life flashed before her eyes the summer of 2018 after a snake bit her in the middle of a photo shoot in Miami. “They told me the venom wouldn’t leave my body within 12 months… I thought it will leave sooner but it was worse with the months” said sobbing Miss Universe Puerto Rico 2005. 
Doctors had told her “you probably won't be the same person, you will have to use a machine in your leg, so you can be able to walk.

Filmography

Awards and nominations

See also
List of Puerto Ricans

References

External links
  Official website
An Interview with Cynthia Olavarría
Cynthia Olavarría in the Internet Movie Database
Cynthia's Love 

1982 births
21st-century Puerto Rican actresses
Living people
Miss Puerto Rico winners
Miss Universe 2005 contestants
People from Santurce, Puerto Rico
Puerto Rican beauty pageant winners
Puerto Rican female models
Puerto Rican people of Spanish descent
Puerto Rican telenovela actresses